Jalan Merlimau Darat or Jalan Batu Gajah (Malacca state route M14) is a major road in Malacca state, Malaysia

List of junctions

Roads in Malacca